The Atlantic City Country Club is a golf club located in Northfield, New Jersey,  west of Atlantic City. In addition to a golf course, the club offers banquet and dining facilities.

History
The club was established in 1897. It was purchased by Hilton Hotels in 1998. It came under the ownership of Caesars Entertainment Corporation until April 15, 2014, when it was sold to Ottinger family group, the owners of Scotland Run Golf Club and Ballamor Golf Club. 

The term "birdie", which means one stroke under par, was coined at the club in 1903.

National championships
The club has hosted six national championships conducted by the United States Golf Association:

 It also hosted an event on the Senior PGA Tour in 1980, the Atlantic City Senior International, won by Don January.

References

External links
Official website

Golf clubs and courses in New Jersey
Buildings and structures in Atlantic County, New Jersey
Tourist attractions in Atlantic County, New Jersey
Sports venues completed in 1897
1897 establishments in New Jersey